The third series of Dancing on Ice aired from 13 January to 16 March 2008 on ITV. The show moved from Saturday nights to Sunday nights, with Phillip Schofield and Holly Willoughby returning to present. Karen Barber, Nicky Slater, Jason Gardiner and Robin Cousins returned to the "Ice Panel", with Ruthie Henshall joining the panel as a replacement for Natalia Bestemianova. The commissioning of the series was first confirmed by Schofield at the 2007 BAFTA Awards.

Judges and Hosts 

It was announced that Bestemianova would depart the series. Robin Cousins, Karen Barber, Nicky Slater and Jason Gardiner announced their returns, with Ruthie Henshall joining the show. Holly Willoughby and Phillip Schofield announced their returns and coaches Jayne Torvill and Christopher Dean also returning.

Contestants 
The contestants for the third series were revealed on 7 January 2008:

Scoring chart

Red numbers indicate the lowest score of the week
Green numbers indicate the highest score of the week
 indicates that the couple were in the skate off
 indicates that the couple were eliminated
 indicates that the couple withdrew from the competition
 indicates that the couple won
 indicates that the couple came in second place
 indicates that the couple came in third place
"—" indicates the couple who did not skate that week

Average score chart
This table only counts for dances scored on a traditional 30-points scale.

Live show details

Results summary
Colour key

 Zaraah Abrahams entered the competition week 3 as replacement for Michael Underwood.

Week 1 (13 January)

Judges' votes to save
 Barber: Samantha & Pavel
 Slater: Samantha & Pavel
 Gardiner: Samantha & Pavel
 Henshall: Samantha & Pavel
 Cousins: Samantha & Pavel

Week 2 (20 January)

Judges' votes to save
Barber: Natalie & Andrei
Slater: Tim & Victoria
Gardiner: Tim & Victoria
Henshall: Tim & Victoria
Cousins: Natalie & Andrei

Week 3 (27 January)
Guest performance: Westlife - World of Our Own & Us Against the World

On 24 January 2008 Michael Underwood & Melanie Lambert had to withdraw due to an ankle injury.

Judges' votes to save
Barber: Steve & Susie
Slater: Steve & Susie
Gardiner: Steve & Susie
Henshall: Steve & Susie
Cousins: Steve & Susie

Week 4 (3 February)
Theme: Broadway Night

Judges' votes to save
Barber: Steve & Susie
Slater: Steve & Susie
Gardiner: Steve & Susie
Henshall: Steve & Susie 
Cousins: Steve & Susie

Week 5 (10 February)

Judges' votes to save
Barber: Steve & Susie
Slater: Steve & Susie
Gardiner: Steve & Susie
Henshall: Steve & Susie
Cousins: Steve & Susie

Week 6 (17 February)
Theme: 60's Night

Judges' votes to save
Barber: Zaraah & Fred 
Slater: Zaraah & Fred 
Gardiner: Zaraah & Fred 
Henshall: Zaraah & Fred 
Cousins: Zaraah & Fred

Week 7 (24 February)

Judges' votes to save
Barber: Zaraah & Fred
Slater: Zaraah & Fred
Gardiner: Zaraah & Fred
Henshall: Zaraah & Fred
Cousins:  Zaraah & Fred

Week 8 (2 March)

Judges' votes to save
Barber: Zaraah & Fred 
Slater: Greg & Kristina
Gardiner: Zaraah & Fred 
Henshall: Zaraah & Fred 
Cousins: Zaraah & Fred

Week 9 (9 March)

Judges' votes to save
Barber: Zaraah & Fred 
Slater: Zaraah & Fred
Gardiner: Zaraah & Fred 
Henshall: Zaraah & Fred
Cousins: Zaraah & Fred

Week 10: Finale (16 March)

Ratings 
Ratings sourced from BARB.

References

Series 03
2008 British television seasons